†Partula aurantia, common name the Moorean viviparous tree snail, was a species of air-breathing tropical land snail, a terrestrial pulmonate gastropod mollusk in the family Partulidae. This species was endemic to French Polynesia. It is now extinct.

References

External links

Partula (gastropod)
Extinct gastropods
Taxonomy articles created by Polbot
Gastropods described in 1932